The North West Women's Regional Football League (NWWRFL) is one of the eight English regional leagues comprising the fifth and sixth tiers of the English women's football pyramid. The other seven leagues are the North East, East Midlands, West Midlands, Eastern, London and South East, South West and Southern. The NWWRFL includes teams from several counties in the north west of England. Broadly, these are Cumbria, Lancashire, Greater Manchester, Merseyside, Cheshire, Shropshire and Staffordshire.

The league has two levels: the tier five Premier Division and, split geographically, the tier six Division One North and Division One South. The Premier Division has promotion into the FA Women's National League Division One (tier four). Division One North and Division One South have relegation into four county leagues (all tier seven): Cheshire Women's & Youth Football League Premier Division; Greater Manchester Women's Football League Premier Division; Lancashire FA Women's County League Division One; and Liverpool Women's & Youth Football League Division One.

History
The league was founded in 1989, with the merger of the Greater Manchester and Merseyside League, the North West Women's League, and the Three Counties League.  On formation, it had 42 teams, spread over four divisions.

The former Women's Football Association (WFA) was established in 1969, independently of the FA. While progress was made at the national and international levels, grassroots development was hindered by lack of funding and, by 1993, there were only 80 girls' teams nationwide, including some in Lancashire, Liverpool and Manchester. In 1993, the WFA disbanded as governance of women's football was accepted by the FA. Among the FA's priorities were, as in men's football, to develop a pyramid system of leagues throughout the country and to establish regional governance by county associations. These include the Lancashire County Football Association which, in 1996, established the Lancashire FA Women's County League, originally known as the Lancashire FA Girls League.

As the number of teams and local leagues grew, the women's pyramid was restructured and the North West Women's Regional Football League was formally reconstituted in 2003. Growth was boosted by affiliation of women's teams to professional clubs – for example, when the NWWRFL began in 2003–04, the Premier Division included teams affiliated to Bury, Bolton Wanderers and Preston North End, all members of the Football League. Originally, the NWWRFL had four levels – a Premier Division and three lower levels called Divisions One, Two and Three – with promotion and relegation in between. The Premier Division had promotion into the former Northern Combination Women's Football League. The league's inaugural season was 2003–04 when the Premier Division champions were Preston North End WFC, who were unbeaten in their 17 matches. There were ten founder members of the Premier Division: AFC Darwen Ladies, Bolton Wanderers Ladies, Bury FC Women, Chorley Women FC, Hopwood Ladies, Liverpool Feds, Preston North End WFC, Stretford Victoria, Warrington Town Ladies and Witton Albion Ladies.

In 2005, the NWWRFL's structure was changed from four levels to two by the combination of the old Divisions One, Two and Three into  Division One North and Division One South, which are both in level six of the pyramid and split geographically. During the 2000s, there was further reorganisation of women's football at county level and, in addition to the tier seven Lancashire League, others were established in Cheshire, Greater Manchester, and Merseyside. The top divisions of these four leagues have promotion into NWWRFL Divisions One North and One South. The Premier Division was unchanged in 2005 and is now a level five league with promotion into the level four FA Women's National League Division One. It is one of eight level five leagues nationally, the others being the North East, East Midlands, West Midlands, Eastern, London and South East, South West and Southern.

The NWWRFL's first season as a two-level structure was 2005–06 in which the Premier Division champions were Stretford Victoria. The first winners of Division One North and South were Saint Domingo's (based in Huyton, Liverpool) and AFC Urmston Meadowside (based in Davyhulme, Manchester) respectively.

The league's 2019–20 season was cancelled due to the Covid-19 pandemic and all matches were declared null and void. The 2020–21 season began but, after more Covid-related disruption, it was curtailed on 16 March 2021 with no titles, promotions or relegations. For the 2021–22 season, the league has been enlarged from 30 to 34 clubs as both Division One North and South now have twelve members.

2021–22 teams

Premier Division
There are ten teams (with venues in parentheses) in the Premier Division with a geographical spread covering Cheshire, Lancashire, Greater Manchester and Merseyside:
 AFC Darwen Ladies (Anchor Road, Darwen)
 Cheadle Town Stingers (Park Road, Cheadle; formerly Manchester Stingers)
 Crewe Alexandra Ladies (Cumberland Arena, Thomas Street, Crewe)
 Fleetwood Town Wrens (Poolfoot Farm, Butts Road, Thornton-Cleveleys)
 Merseyrail Ladies (Admiral Park, Admiral Street, Liverpool; formerly Merseyrail Bootle)
 Mossley Hill Athletic Ladies (Mossley Hill Road, Liverpool)
 Salford City Lionesses (Partington Sports Village, Chapel Lane, Manchester)
 Tranmere Rovers Ladies (Ellesmere Port Sports Village, Stanney Lane, Ellesmere Port)
 West Didsbury & Chorlton Ladies (Step Places Stadium, Brookburn Road, Chorlton-cum-Hardy)
 Wigan Athletic Ladies & Girls (Billinge FC, Barrows Farm, Carr Mill Road, Billinge)

This division also had ten teams in the aborted 2020–21 season, including eight of the above. The other two were FC United of Manchester Women, who gained promotion to the FA Women's National League Division One North via the FA's application process; and Morecambe Ladies First, who were unable to raise a team for 2021–22. They were replaced by Salford City Lionesses, promoted from Division One South; and AFC Darwen Ladies, promoted from Division One North.

Division One North
Division One North has twelve teams from Cumbria and Lancashire:
 Accrington Stanley Community Trust Ladies (Thorneyholme Road, Accrington)
 Blackburn Community Sports Club Ladies (Queen Elizabeth Grammar School, Lammack Road, Blackburn)
 Blackpool FC Ladies (HASSRA Sports Pavilion, Anchorsholme Lane East, Thornton-Cleveleys)
 Carlisle United Ladies (Creighton Rugby Club, Sycamore Lane, Parkland, Carlisle)
 Chorley Women FC (Horwich St Mary's FC, Scholes Bank, Horwich, Bolton)
 Haslingden St Mary's Ladies & Girls (Valley Leadership Academy, Fearns Moss, Bacup)
 Morecambe Ladies Reserves (Vale of Lune RUFC, Powderhouse Lane, Lancaster)
 Penrith AFC Ladies (Frenchfield Park, Carleton Road, Penrith)
 Penwortham Town Ladies (Vernon's Sports Club, Factory Lane, Penwortham)
 Preston North End Women's FC (Penwortham Priory Academy, Crow Hills Road, Preston)
 Sir Tom Finney FC Ladies (UCLAN Sports Arena #1, Tom Benson Way, Cottam, Preston)
 Workington Reds Ladies (St Benedict's School 3G, Red Lonning, Whitehaven)

This division had ten teams in the aborted 2020–21 season, including nine of the above. AFC Darwen Ladies were promoted to the Premier Division for 2021–22 and the three new teams are Accrington, Chorley and Haslingden St Mary's.

Division One South
Division One South has twelve teams from Cheshire, Greater Manchester, Merseyside and Staffordshire:
 Alder FC Women (Alder Sports Club, Alder Road, Liverpool)
 Altrincham FC Women (Manor Farm Complex, Ridgeway Road, Timperley, Altrincham)
 Chester FC Women (Ellesmere Port Sports Village 3G, Stanney Lane, Ellesmere Port)
 Curzon Ashton FC Women (Armitage Centre, Moseley Road, Fallowfield)
 Didsbury FC Ladies (Didsbury Sports Ground, Simons Fields, Ford Lane, Manchester)
 Hindley Juniors Women (Hindley Juniors FC, Park Lane, Hindley, Wigan)
 Mersey Valley Ladies (Mersey Valley Sports Club, Banky Lane, Ashton upon Mersey)
 Northwich Vixens (Park Stadium, Manchester Road, Lostock Gralam, Northwich)
 Runcorn Linnets FC Ladies (Millbank Linnets Stadium, Murdishaw Avenue, Runcorn)
 Warrington Wolves Foundation Women (Tetley Walker Recreation Ground, Long Lane, Warrington)
 West Kirby Ladies (Marine Park, Greenbank Road, West Kirby)
 Wythenshawe Amateurs Women (Hollyhedge Park, Altrincham Road, Sharston)

This division had ten teams in the aborted 2020–21 season, including nine of the above. Salford City Lionesses were promoted to the Premier Division for 2021–22 and the three new teams are Alder FC, Hindley Juniors and Mersey Valley Ladies.

Champions
The league began in the 2003–04 season with four divisions which were reduced to two before the 2005–06 season. Since then, the structure has been a Premier Division (tier five) and a Division One (tier six) which is itself geographically partitioned into North and South sub-divisions. Some of the teams listed below were short-lived and are now defunct.

References

External links 
 North West Football Trust

5